Jericho Creek is a seven-mile long tributary of Hunting Creek located in Lake County, California. Rising on Bishop Mountain, the stream flows northeast through Jericho Valley, then flows southeast and southwest through Paradise Valley to its confluence with Hunting Creek.

References

Rivers of California